Jan Andreas "Tallie" Broodryk  (11 April 1910 – 22 October 1993) was a South African rugby union player.

Biography
Broodryk was born in Loxton, schooled in Tulbagh and then joined the South African Police. After the establishment of the Northern Transvaal, Broodryk played in its very first match against Transvaal on Monday, 18 April 1938. Along with Broodryk, there were six more Springboks in the Northern Transvaal team, namely, Ferdie Bergh, who captained the side, Roger Sherriff, Lukas Strachan, Nick Bierman, Ben du Toit and the scrumhalf Danie Craven.

Broodryk was a member of the 1937 Springbok touring team to Australia and New Zealand. He did not play in any of the test matches, but played in 6 tour matches and scored 6 tries and a drop goal.

See also
List of South Africa national rugby union players – Springbok no. 244

References

1910 births
1993 deaths
South African rugby union players
South Africa international rugby union players
Golden Lions players
Blue Bulls players
People from Ubuntu Local Municipality
Rugby union wings
Rugby union players from the Northern Cape